Jiahe Subdistrict is a subdistrict of Baiyun District, Guangzhou, People's Republic of China. As of 2020, it has 9 residential communities under its administration.

See also
List of township-level divisions of Guangdong

References 

Township-level divisions of Guangdong
Baiyun District, Guangzhou
Subdistricts of the People's Republic of China